Suki-ye Olya (also Romanized as Sūkī-ye ‘Olyā; also known as Deh Now-ye Sūkī-ye ‘Olyā) is a village in Beyranvand-e Jonubi Rural District, Bayravand District, Khorramabad County, Lorestan Province, Iran. At the 2006 census, its population was 80, in 14 families.

References 

Towns and villages in Khorramabad County